Below is a list of those who have held the office of Governor of Kingston upon Hull:

Governors of Kingston upon Hull

1536: John Hallam
1546–1552: Sir Michael Stanhope (beheaded, 1552)
?-1639: Sir John Hotham, 1st Baronet
1639–1641: Sir Thomas Glemham
1642–?: William Cavendish, 1st Duke of Newcastle (Royalist)
1642–?1645: Sir John Hotham, 1st Baronet (Parliamentary) (beheaded by Parliament, 1645)
1645: Ferdinando Fairfax, 2nd Lord Fairfax of Cameron (Parliamentary)
1645: Sir Thomas Fairfax (Parliamentary) Robert Overton served as his nominee until 1648;
1648–1654: Robert Overton (arrested for his alleged involvement in the Wildman conspiracy) 
1655-1659: Henry Smith
1659: Robert Overton
1660–1661: Charles Fairfax
1661–1673: John Belasyse, 1st Baron Belasyse
1673–1679: James Scott, 1st Duke of Monmouth
1679–1682: John Sheffield, 3rd Earl of Mulgrave
1682–1687: Thomas Hickman-Windsor, 1st Earl of Plymouth
1687–1689: Marmaduke Langdale, 2nd Baron Langdale
1689–1699: Thomas Osborne, 1st Duke of Leeds
1699–1711: John Holles, 1st Duke of Newcastle-upon-Tyne
1711–1715: Richard Sutton
1715–1721: Rich Ingram, 5th Viscount of Irvine
1721–1725: Thomas Stanwix
1725–1732: George Cholmondeley, 2nd Earl of Cholmondeley
1732–1738: Edward Montagu
1738–1740?: Charles Spencer, 3rd Duke of Marlborough
1740–1741: James Dormer
1743–1766: Harry Pulteney
1766–1785: Philip Honywood
1785–1794: James Murray
1794–1795: George Townshend, 1st Marquess Townshend
1795–1801: William Harcourt, 3rd Earl Harcourt
1801–1808: John de Burgh, 13th Earl of Clanricarde
1808–1813: Sir William Medows
1813–1814: Charles Lennox, 4th Duke of Richmond
1814–1830: Rowland Hill, 1st Baron Hill
1830–1843: William Cathcart, 1st Earl Cathcart

Lieutenant-Governors of Hull
1645–1648: Robert Overton
1711–1714: Bernard Granville
1749–1782: Lord Robert Manners
1782–1789: William Cashell
1789–1801: Thomas Jones
1801–1816: Francis Cunynghame
1816–1854: Sir Charles Wade Thornton

References

The London Gazette

History of Kingston upon Hull
Governors of Kingston upon Hull
Kingston upon Hull